Güzelce Ali Pasha (Ali Pasha the Handsome; died 9 March 1621), also known as Çelebi Ali Pasha or İstanköylü Ali Pasha, was an Ottoman statesman and military figure. He was Kapudan Pasha (grand admiral of the Ottoman Navy) around 1617 and Grand Vizier of the Ottoman Empire from 1619 to 1621.

He was the son of İstanköylü Ahmed Pasha, an Ottoman governor of Tunis.

In 1616 he married Fatma Sultan, a daughter of Sultan Mehmed III by his consort Handan Hatun. 

Güzelce Ali Pasha died of inflammation of the gallbladder on 9 March 1621, although there were rumours that Sultan Osman II himself had crept into Ali's tent and strangled him with his own hands due to an ill-advised military campaign on the Polish borderlands.

See also
 List of Ottoman Grand Viziers
 List of Kapudan Pashas

References 

17th-century Grand Viziers of the Ottoman Empire
Kapudan Pashas
Military personnel from Istanbul
1621 deaths